This is a list of Ancestral Puebloan dwellings in New Mexico, United States.

Locations

See also 
 History of New Mexico

References 

 
Dwellings
Pueblos
Pueblos
New Mexico
Pueblos
Native American history of New Mexico
Religious places of the indigenous peoples of North America
Puebloan